Tootey Huwey Per is a 2011 Pakistani soap television series broadcast on Geo Entertainment. It was directed by Mohsin Mirza and produced by Asif Raza Mir and Babar Javed under banner A&B Entertainment.

It was also telecast on Zindagi TV channel in India as Khwahishein, airing from 7 January 2015 to 4 May 2015.

Plot
The heart-rending story of a simple middle-class family and their dreams and aspirations. Ajiya and Nimra are the daughters of hard working, lower-middle class Sibghatullah and his wife Zainab. A man of immense dignity and integrity, Sibghatullah has always managed to provide for his five children and wife within his very modest means.
 
However, as the story unfolds we see Ajiya and Nimra take two very different paths in life.

For Ajiya, money is everything and her one aim in life is to be rich. For Nimra, safeguarding her parents’ integrity is of utmost importance to her, even if it comes at the expense of her own happiness. Set against the backdrop of age-old culture, tradition and the harsh realities of living in an extended family; this is a soap which will throw light on the pressures of living in today's materialistic times.

Cast
Ayeza Khan as Ajiya
Anoushay Abbasi as Nimra, Ajiya's younger sister
Seema Seher as Zainab, Ajiya's and Nimra's Mother
Khalid Zafar as Sibghatullah, Ajiya & Nimra's Father
Qaiser Naqvi as Dadi, Ajiya and NImra's grandmother; Sibghatullah's mother
Mohib Mirza as Sameer, Ajiya & Nimra's Cousin
Sami Khan as Zayeem, Ajiya & Nimra's Cousin
 Hassan Ahmed as Aun/Junaid
Sajid Hussain Shah as Sadakat, Ajiya and Nimra's uncle; Sibghatullah's younger brother
Nausheen Ibrahim as Farhat, Sameer's Sister
Akhtar Hasnain as Ajiya's brother
Ayesha Gul as Saima, Ajiya and Nimra's sister-in-law
Esha Noor as Farzana

References

External links 
 Tootey Huwey Per

Geo TV original programming
2011 Pakistani television series debuts
Urdu-language television shows
Pakistani television soap operas
Zee Zindagi original programming